Akinwande Oluwole Babatunde Soyinka (Yoruba: Akínwándé Olúwọlé Babátúndé Ṣóyíinká; born 13 July 1934), known as Wole Soyinka, is a Nigerian playwright, novelist, poet, and essayist in the English language. He was awarded the 1986 Nobel Prize in Literature, for "in a wide cultural perspective and with poetic overtones fashioning the drama of existence", the first sub-Saharan African to be honoured in that category.
Soyinka was born into a Yoruba family in Abeokuta. In 1954, he attended Government College in Ibadan, and subsequently University College Ibadan and the University of Leeds in England. After studying in Nigeria and the UK, he worked with the Royal Court Theatre in London. He went on to write plays that were produced in both countries, in theatres and on radio. He took an active role in Nigeria's political history and its campaign for independence from British colonial rule. In 1965, he seized the Western Nigeria Broadcasting Service studio and broadcast a demand for the cancellation of the Western Nigeria Regional Elections. In 1967, during the Nigerian Civil War, he was arrested by the federal government of General Yakubu Gowon and put in solitary confinement for two years, for volunteering to be a non-government mediating actor.

Soyinka has been a strong critic of successive Nigerian (and African at large) governments, especially the country's many military dictators, as well as other political tyrannies, including the Mugabe regime in Zimbabwe. Much of his writing has been concerned with "the oppressive boot and the irrelevance of the colour of the foot that wears it". During the regime of General Sani Abacha (1993–98), Soyinka escaped from Nigeria on a motorcycle via the "NADECO Route." Abacha later proclaimed a death sentence against him "in absentia." With civilian rule restored to Nigeria in 1999, Soyinka returned to his nation.

In Nigeria, Soyinka was a Professor of Comparative literature (1975 to 1999) at the Obafemi Awolowo University, then called the University of Ifẹ̀. With civilian rule restored to Nigeria in 1999, he was made professor emeritus. While in the United States, he first taught at Cornell University as Goldwin Smith professor for African Studies and Theatre Arts from 1988 to 1991 and then at Emory University, where in 1996 he was appointed Robert W. Woodruff Professor of the Arts. Soyinka has been a Professor of Creative Writing at the University of Nevada, Las Vegas, and has served as scholar-in-residence at NYU's Institute of African American Affairs and at Loyola Marymount University in Los Angeles, California. He has also taught at the universities of Cambridge, Oxford, Harvard and Yale. Soyinka was also a Distinguished Scholar in Residence at Duke University in 2008.

In December 2017, Soyinka was awarded the Europe Theatre Prize in the "Special Prize" category awarded to someone who has "contributed to the realization of cultural events that promote understanding and the exchange of knowledge between peoples".

Life and work

A descendant of the rulers of Isara, Soyinka was born the second of seven children, in the city of Abẹokuta, Ogun State, in Nigeria, at that time a British Dominion. His siblings were Atinuke "Tinu" Aina Soyinka, Femi Soyinka , Yeside Soyinka, Omofolabo "Folabo" Ajayi-Soyinka and Kayode Soyinka. His younger sister Folashade Soyinka died on her first birthday. His father, Samuel Ayodele Soyinka (whom he called S.A. or "Essay"), was an Anglican minister and the headmaster of St. Peters School in Abẹokuta. Having solid family connections, the elder Soyinka was a cousin of the Odemo, or King, of Isara-Remo Samuel Akinsanya, a founding father of Nigeria. Soyinka's mother, Grace Eniola Soyinka (née Jenkins-Harrison) (whom he dubbed the "Wild Christian"), owned a shop in the nearby market. She was a political activist within the women's movement in the local community. She was also Anglican. As much of the community followed indigenous Yorùbá religious tradition, Soyinka grew up in a religious atmosphere of syncretism, with influences from both cultures. He was raised in a religious family, attending church services and singing in the choir from an early age; however, Soyinka himself became an atheist later in life. His father's position enabled him to get electricity and radio at home. He writes extensively about his childhood in his memoir Aké: The Years of Childhood (1981).

His mother was one of the most prominent members of the influential Ransome-Kuti family: she was the granddaughter of Rev. Canon J. J. Ransome-Kuti as the only daughter of his first daughter Anne Lape Iyabode Ransome-Kuti, and was therefore a niece to Olusegun Azariah Ransome-Kuti, Oludotun Ransome-Kuti and niece in-law to Funmilayo Ransome-Kuti. Among Soyinka's first cousins once removed were the musician Fela Kuti, the human rights activist Beko Ransome-Kuti, politician Olikoye Ransome-Kuti and activist Yemisi Ransome-Kuti. His second cousins include musicians Femi Kuti and Seun Kuti, and dancer Yeni Kuti. His younger brother Femi Soyinka became a medical doctor and a university professor.

In 1940, after attending St. Peter's Primary School in Abeokuta, Soyinka went to Abeokuta Grammar School, where he won several prizes for literary composition. In 1946 he was accepted by Government College in Ibadan, at that time one of Nigeria's elite secondary schools.
After finishing his course at Government College in 1952, he began studies at University College Ibadan (1952–54), affiliated with the University of London. He studied English literature, Greek, and Western history. Among his lecturers was Molly Mahood, a British literary scholar. In the year 1953–54, his second and last at University College, Soyinka began work on "Keffi's Birthday Treat", a short radio play for Nigerian Broadcasting Service that was broadcast in July 1954. While at university, Soyinka and six others founded the Pyrates Confraternity, an anti-corruption and justice-seeking student organisation, the first confraternity in Nigeria.

Later in 1954, Soyinka relocated to England, where he continued his studies in English literature, under the supervision of his mentor Wilson Knight at the University of Leeds (1954–57). He met numerous young, gifted British writers. Before defending his B.A. degree, Soyinka began publishing and working as editor for a satirical magazine called The Eagle; he wrote a column on academic life, in which he often criticised his university peers.

Early career
After graduating with an upper second-class degree, Soyinka remained in Leeds and began working on an MA. He intended to write new works combining European theatrical traditions with those of his Yorùbá cultural heritage. His first major play, The Swamp Dwellers (1958), was followed a year later by The Lion and the Jewel, a comedy that attracted interest from several members of London's Royal Court Theatre. Encouraged, Soyinka moved to London, where he worked as a play reader for the Royal Court Theatre. During the same period, both of his plays were performed in Ibadan. They dealt with the uneasy relationship between progress and tradition in Nigeria.

In 1957, his play The Invention was the first of his works to be produced at the Royal Court Theatre. At that time his only published works were poems such as "The Immigrant" and "My Next Door Neighbour", which were published in the Nigerian magazine Black Orpheus. This was founded in 1957 by the German scholar Ulli Beier, who had been teaching at the University of Ibadan since 1950.

Soyinka received a Rockefeller Research Fellowship from University College in Ibadan, his alma mater, for research on African theatre, and he returned to Nigeria. After its fifth issue (November 1959), Soyinka replaced Jahnheinz Jahn to become coeditor for the literary periodical Black Orpheus (its name derived from a 1948 essay by Jean-Paul Sartre, "Orphée Noir", published as a preface to Anthologie de la nouvelle poésie nègre et malgache, edited by Léopold Senghor). He produced his new satire, The Trials of Brother Jero in the dining hall at Mellanby Hall of University College Ibadan, in April 1960. That year, his work A Dance of The Forest, a biting criticism of Nigeria's political elites, won a contest that year as the official play for Nigerian Independence Day. On 1 October 1960, it premiered in Lagos as Nigeria celebrated its sovereignty. The play satirizes the fledgling nation by showing that the present is no more a golden age than was the past. Also in 1960, Soyinka established the "Nineteen-Sixty Masks", an amateur acting ensemble to which he devoted considerable time over the next few years.

Soyinka wrote the first full-length play produced on Nigerian television. Entitled My Father's Burden and directed by Segun Olusola, the play was featured on the Western Nigeria Television (WNTV) on 6 August 1960. Soyinka published works satirising the "Emergency" in the Western Region of Nigeria, as his Yorùbá homeland was increasingly occupied and controlled by the federal government. The political tensions arising from recent post-colonial independence eventually led to a military coup and civil war (1967–70).

With the Rockefeller grant, Soyinka bought a Land Rover, and he began travelling throughout the country as a researcher with the Department of English Language of the University College in Ibadan. In an essay of the time, he criticised Leopold Senghor's Négritude movement as a nostalgic and indiscriminate glorification of the black African past that ignores the potential benefits of modernisation. He is often quoted as having said, "A tiger doesn't proclaim his tigritude, he pounces." But in fact, Soyinka wrote in a 1960 essay for the Horn: "the duiker will not paint 'duiker' on his beautiful back to proclaim his duikeritude; you'll know him by his elegant leap." In Death and the King's Horsemen he states: "The elephant trails no tethering-rope; that king is not yet crowned who will peg an elephant."

In December 1962, Soyinka's essay "Towards a True Theater" was published. He began teaching with the Department of English Language at Obafemi Awolowo University in Ifẹ. He discussed current affairs with "négrophiles," and on several occasions openly condemned government censorship. At the end of 1963, his first feature-length movie, Culture in Transition, was released. In 1965 The Interpreters, "a complex but also vividly documentary novel", was published in London by André Deutsch.

That December, together with scientists and men of theatre, Soyinka founded the Drama Association of Nigeria. In 1964 he also resigned his university post, as a protest against imposed pro-government behaviour by the authorities. A few months later, in 1965, he was arrested for the first time, charged with holding up a radio station at gunpoint (as described in his 2006 memoir You Must Set Forth at Dawn) and replacing the tape of a recorded speech by the premier of Western Nigeria with a different tape containing accusations of election malpractice. Soyinka was released after a few months of confinement, as a result of protests by the international community of writers. This same year he wrote two more dramatic pieces: Before the Blackout and the comedy Kongi's Harvest. He also wrote The Detainee, a radio play for the BBC in London. His play The Road premiered in London at the Commonwealth Arts Festival, opening on 14 September 1965, at the Theatre Royal. At the end of the year, he was promoted to headmaster and senior lecturer in the Department of English Language at University of Lagos.

Soyinka's political speeches at that time criticised the cult of personality and government corruption in African dictatorships. In April 1966, his play Kongi's Harvest was produced in revival at the World Festival of Negro Arts in Dakar, Senegal. The Road was awarded the Grand Prix. In June 1965, his play The Trials of Brother Jero was produced at the Hampstead Theatre Club in London, and in December 1966 The Lion and the Jewel was staged at the Royal Court Theatre.

Civil war and imprisonment
After becoming Chair of Drama at the University of Ibadan, Soyinka became more politically active. Following the military coup of January 1966, he secretly and unofficially met with the military governor Chukwuemeka Odumegwu Ojukwu in the Southeastern town of Enugu (August 1967), to try to avert the Nigerian civil war. As a result, he had to go into hiding.

He was imprisoned for 22 months as civil war ensued between the Federal government of Nigeria and the Biafrans. Though refused materials such as books, pens, and paper, he still wrote a significant body of poems and notes criticising the Nigerian government while in prison.

Despite his imprisonment, his play The Lion and The Jewel was produced in Accra, Ghana, in September 1967. In November that year, The Trials of Brother Jero and The Strong Breed were produced in the Greenwich Mews Theatre in New York City. Soyinka also published a collection of his poetry, Idanre and Other Poems, which was inspired by his visit to the sanctuary of the Yorùbá deity Ogun, whom he regards as his "companion" deity, kindred spirit, and protector.

In 1968, the Negro Ensemble Company in New York produced Kongi's Harvest. While still imprisoned, Soyinka translated from Yoruba a fantastical novel by his compatriot D. O. Fagunwa, entitled The Forest of a Thousand Demons: A Hunter's Saga.

Release and literary production
In October 1969, when the civil war came to an end, amnesty was proclaimed, and Soyinka and other political prisoners were freed. For the first few months after his release, Soyinka stayed at a friend's farm in southern France, where he sought solitude. He wrote The Bacchae of Euripides (1969), a reworking of the Pentheus myth. He soon published in London a book of poetry, Poems from Prison. At the end of the year, he returned to his office as Chair of Drama at Ibadan.

In 1970, he produced the play Kongi's Harvest, while simultaneously adapting it as a film of the same title. In June 1970, he finished another play, called Madmen and Specialists. Together with the group of 15 actors of Ibadan University Theatre Art Company, he went on a trip to the United States, to the Eugene O'Neill Memorial Theatre Center in Waterford, Connecticut, where his latest play premiered. It gave them all experience with theatrical production in another English-speaking country.

In 1971, his poetry collection A Shuttle in the Crypt was published. Madmen and Specialists was produced in Ibadan that year. Soyinka travelled to Paris to take the lead role as Patrice Lumumba, the murdered first Prime Minister of the Republic of the Congo, in the production of his Murderous Angels.

In April 1971, concerned about the political situation in Nigeria, Soyinka resigned from his duties at the University in Ibadan, and began years of voluntary exile. In July in Paris, excerpts from his well-known play The Dance of The Forests were performed.

In 1972, his novel Season of Anomy and his Collected Plays were both published by Oxford University Press. His powerful autobiographical work The Man Died, a collection of notes from prison, was also published that year. He was awarded an Honoris Causa doctorate by the University of Leeds in 1973. In the same year the National Theatre, London, commissioned and premiered the play The Bacchae of Euripides, and his plays Camwood on the Leaves and Jero's Metamorphosis were also first published. From 1973 to 1975, Soyinka spent time on scientific studies. He spent a year as a visiting fellow at Churchill College, Cambridge University  1973–74 and wrote Death and the King's Horseman, which had its first reading at Churchill College (which Dapo Ladimeji and Skip Gates attended), and gave a series of lectures at a number of European universities.

In 1974, his Collected Plays, Volume II was issued by Oxford University Press. In 1975 Soyinka was promoted to the position of editor for Transition, a magazine based in the Ghanaian capital of Accra, where he moved for some time. He used his columns in Transition to criticise the "negrophiles" (for instance, his article "Neo-Tarzanism: The Poetics of Pseudo-Transition") and military regimes. He protested against the military junta of Idi Amin in Uganda. After the political turnover in Nigeria and the subversion of Gowon's military regime in 1975, Soyinka returned to his homeland and resumed his position as Chair of Comparative Literature at the University of Ife.

In 1976, he published his poetry collection Ogun Abibiman, as well as a collection of essays entitled Myth, Literature and the African World. In these, Soyinka explores the genesis of mysticism in African theatre and, using examples from both European and African literature, compares and contrasts the cultures. He delivered a series of guest lectures at the Institute of African Studies at the University of Ghana in Legon. In October, the French version of The Dance of The Forests was performed in Dakar, while in Ife, his play Death and The King's Horseman premièred.

In 1977, Opera Wọnyọsi, his adaptation of Bertolt Brecht's The Threepenny Opera, was staged in Ibadan. In 1979 he both directed and acted in Jon Blair and Norman Fenton's drama The Biko Inquest, a work based on the life of Steve Biko, a South African student and human rights activist who was beaten to death by apartheid police forces. In 1981 Soyinka published his autobiographical work Aké: The Years of Childhood, which won a 1983 Anisfield-Wolf Book Award.

Soyinka founded another theatrical group called the Guerrilla Unit. Its goal was to work with local communities in analysing their problems and to express some of their grievances in dramatic sketches. In 1983 his play Requiem for a Futurologist had its first performance at the University of Ife. In July, one of his musical projects, the Unlimited Liability Company, issued a long-playing record entitled I Love My Country, on which several prominent Nigerian musicians played songs composed by Soyinka. In 1984, he directed the film Blues for a Prodigal, which was screened at the University of Ife. His A Play of Giants was produced the same year.

During the years 1975–84, Soyinka was more politically active. At the University of Ife, his administrative duties included the security of public roads. He criticized the corruption in the government of the democratically elected President Shehu Shagari. When he was replaced by the army general Muhammadu Buhari, Soyinka was often at odds with the military. In 1984, a Nigerian court banned his 1972 book The Man Died: Prison Notes. In 1985, his play Requiem for a Futurologist was published in London by Rex Collings.

Since 1986

Soyinka was awarded the Nobel Prize for Literature in 1986, becoming the first African laureate. He was described as one "who in a wide cultural perspective and with poetic overtones fashions the drama of existence". Reed Way Dasenbrock writes that the award of the Nobel Prize in Literature to Soyinka is "likely to prove quite controversial and thoroughly deserved". He also notes that "it is the first Nobel Prize awarded to an African writer or to any writer from the 'new literatures' in English that have emerged in the former colonies of the British Empire." His Nobel acceptance speech, "This Past Must Address Its Present", was devoted to South African freedom-fighter Nelson Mandela. Soyinka's speech was an outspoken criticism of apartheid and the politics of racial segregation imposed on the majority by the National South African government. In 1986, he received the Agip Prize for Literature.

In 1988, his collection of poems Mandela's Earth, and Other Poems was published, while in Nigeria another collection of essays, entitled Art, Dialogue and Outrage: Essays on Literature and Culture, appeared. In the same year, Soyinka accepted the position of Professor of African Studies and Theatre at Cornell University. In 1989, a third novel, inspired by his father's intellectual circle, Ìsarà: A Voyage Around Essay, appeared. In July 1991 the BBC African Service transmitted his radio play A Scourge of Hyacinths, and the next year (1992) in Siena (Italy), his play From Zia with Love had its premiere.Both works are very bitter political parodies, based on events that took place in Nigeria in the 1980s. In 1993 Soyinka was awarded an honorary doctorate from Harvard University. The next year another part of his autobiography appeared: Ibadan: The Penkelemes Years (A Memoir: 1946–1965). The following year his play The Beatification of Area Boy was published. In October 1994, he was appointed UNESCO Goodwill Ambassador for the Promotion of African culture, human rights, freedom of expression, media and communication.

In November 1994, Soyinka fled from Nigeria through the border with Benin and then to the United States. In 1996 his book The Open Sore of a Continent: A Personal Narrative of the Nigerian Crisis was first published. In 1997 he was charged with treason by the government of General Sani Abacha. The International Parliament of Writers (IPW) was established in 1993 to provide support for writers victimized by persecution. Soyinka became the organization's second president from 1997 to 2000. In 1999 a new volume of poems by Soyinka, entitled Outsiders, was released. That same year, a BBC-commissioned play called Document of Identity aired on BBC Radio 3, telling the lightly-fictionalized story of the problems his daughter's family encountered during a stopover in Britain when they fled Nigeria for the US in 1996; her son, Oseoba Airewele was born in Luton and became a stateless person.

Soyinka's play King Baabu premièred in Lagos in 2001, a political satire on the theme of African dictatorship. In 2002, a collection of his poems entitled Samarkand and Other Markets I Have Known was published by Methuen. In April 2006, his memoir You Must Set Forth at Dawn was published by Random House. In 2006 he cancelled his keynote speech for the annual S.E.A. Write Awards Ceremony in Bangkok to protest the Thai military's successful coup against the government.

In April 2007, Soyinka called for the cancellation of the Nigerian presidential elections held two weeks earlier, beset by widespread fraud and violence. In the wake of the attempting bombing on a Northwest Airlines flight to the United States by a Nigerian student who had become radicalised in Britain, Soyinka questioned the British government's social logic in allowing every religion to openly proselytise their faith, asserting that it was being abused by religious fundamentalists, thereby turning England into, in his view, a cesspit for the breeding of extremism. He supported the freedom of worship but warned against the consequence of the illogic of allowing religions to preach apocalyptic violence.

In August 2014, Soyinka delivered a recording of his speech "From Chibok with Love" to the World Humanist Congress in Oxford, hosted by the International Humanist and Ethical Union and the British Humanist Association. The Congress theme was Freedom of thought and expression: Forging a 21st Century Enlightenment. He was awarded the 2014 International Humanist Award. He served as scholar-in-residence at NYU's Institute of African American Affairs.

Soyinka opposes allowing Fulani herdsmen the ability to graze their cattle on open land in southern, Christian-dominated Nigeria and believes these herdsmen should be declared terrorists to enable the restriction of their movements.

In December 2020, Soyinka described 2020 as the most challenging year in the nation's history, saying: "With the turbulence that characterised year 2020, and as activities wind down, the mood has been repugnant and very negative. I don’t want to sound pessimistic but this is one of the most pessimistic years I have known in this nation and it wasn’t just because of COVID-19. Natural disasters had happened elsewhere, but how have you managed to take such in their strides?"

September 2021 saw the publication of Chronicles from the Land of the Happiest People on Earth, Soyinka's first novel in almost 50 years, described in the Financial Times as "a brutally satirical look at power and corruption in Nigeria, told in the form of a whodunnit involving three university friends." Reviewing the book in The Guardian, Ben Okri said: "It is Soyinka's greatest novel, his revenge against the insanities of the nation's ruling class and one of the most shocking chronicles of an African nation in the 21st century. It ought to be widely read."

The film adaptation by Biyi Bandele of Soyinka's 1975 stage play Death And The King's Horseman, co-produced by Netflix and Ebonylife TV, titled Elesin Oba, The King's Horseman, premiered at the Toronto International Film Festival (TIFF) in September 2022. It is Soyinka's first work to be made into a feature film, and the first Yoruba-language film to premiere at TIFF.

Personal life
Soyinka has been married three times and divorced twice. He has eight children from his three marriages and two other daughters. His first marriage was in 1958 to the late British writer Barbara Dixon, whom he met at the University of Leeds in the 1950s. Barbara was the mother of his first son, Olaokun. Then his daughter Morenike. His second marriage was in 1963 to Nigerian librarian Olaide Idowu, with whom he had three daughters – Moremi, Iyetade (deceased), Peyibomi – and a second son, Ilemakin. Soyinka youngest daughter is Amani. Soyinka married Folake Doherty in 1989. They have three sons, Tunlewa, Bojode and Eniara.

In 2014, he revealed his battle with prostate cancer.

Religion
On Sunday, 20 November 2022; during a public presentation of his two-volume collection of essays, Soyinka said in relation to religion:

"Do I really need one (religion)? I have never felt I needed one. I am a mythologist. ... No, I don't worship any deity. But I consider deities as creatively real and therefore my companions in my journey in both the real world and the imaginative world."

Legacy and honours
The Wole Soyinka Annual Lecture Series was founded in 1994 and "is dedicated to honouring one of Nigeria and Africa's most outstanding and enduring literary icons: Professor Wole Soyinka". It is organised by the National Association of Seadogs (Pyrates Confraternity), which organisation Soyinka with six other students founded in 1952 at the then University College Ibadan.

In 2011, the African Heritage Research Library and Cultural Centre built a writers' enclave in his honour. It is located in Adeyipo Village, Lagelu Local Government Area, Ibadan, Oyo State, Nigeria. The enclave includes a Writer-in-Residence Programme that enables writers to stay for a period of two, three or six months, engaging in serious creative writing. In 2013, he visited the Benin Moat as the representative of UNESCO in recognition of the Naija seven Wonders project. He is currently the consultant for the Lagos Black Heritage Festival, with the Lagos State deeming him as the only person who could bring out the aims and objectives of the Festival to the people. He was appointed a patron of Humanists UK in 2020.

In 2014, the collection Crucible of the Ages: Essays in Honour of Wole Soyinka at 80, edited by Ivor Agyeman-Duah and Ogochwuku Promise, was published by Bookcraft in Nigeria and Ayebia Clarke Publishing in the UK, with tributes and contributions from Nadine Gordimer, Toni Morrison, Ama Ata Aidoo, Ngugi wa Thiong’o, Henry Louis Gates, Jr, Margaret Busby, Kwame Anthony Appiah, Ali Mazrui, Sefi Atta, and others.

In 2018, Henry Louis Gates, Jr tweeted that Nigerian filmmaker and writer Onyeka Nwelue visited him in Harvard and was making a documentary film on Wole Soyinka. As part of efforts to mark his 84th birthday, a collection of poems titled 84 Delicious Bottles of Wine was published for Wole Soyinka, edited by Onyeka Nwelue and Odega Shawa. Among the notable contributors was Adamu Usman Garko, award-winning teenage essayist, poet and writer.

 1973: Honorary D.Litt., University of Leeds                                     
 1973–74: Overseas Fellow, Churchill College, Cambridge
 1983: Elected an Honorary Fellow of the Royal Society of Literature
 1983: Anisfield-Wolf Book Award, United States
 1986: Nobel Prize for Literature
 1986: Agip Prize for Literature
 1986: Commander of the Order of the Federal Republic (CFR).
 1990: Benson Medal from Royal Society of Literature
 1993: Honorary doctorate, Harvard University
 2002: Honorary fellowship, SOAS
 2005: Honorary doctorate degree, Princeton University
 2005: Enstooled as the Akinlatun of Egbaland, a Nigerian chief, by the Oba Alake of the Egba clan of Yorubaland. Soyinka became a tribal aristocrat by way of this, one vested with the right to use the Yoruba title Oloye as a pre-nominal honorific.
 2009: Golden Plate Award of the American Academy of Achievement presented by Awards Council member Archbishop Desmond Tutu at an awards ceremony at St. George's Cathedral in Cape Town, South Africa
 2013: Anisfield-Wolf Book Award, Lifetime Achievement, United States
 2014: International Humanist Award
 2017: Joins the University of Johannesburg, South Africa, as a Distinguished Visiting Professor in the Faculty of Humanities
 2017: "Special Prize" of the Europe Theatre Prize
 2018: University of Ibadan renamed its arts theater to Wole Soyinka Theatre.
 2018: Honorary Doctorate Degree of Letters, Federal University of Agriculture, Abeokuta (FUNAAB).
 2022: Honorary Degree from Cambridge University: This is a degree that is bestowed upon people who have made outstanding achievements in their respective fields.

Europe Theatre Prize 
In 2017, he received the Special Prize of the Europe Theatre Prize, in Rome. The Prize organization stated:A Special Prize is awarded to Wole Soyinka, writer, playwright and poet, Nobel Prize for literature in 1986, who with his work has been able to create an ideal bridge between Europe and Africa (...) With his art and his commitment, Wole Soyinka has contributed to a renewal of African cultural life, participating actively in the dialogue between Africa and Europe, touching on more and more urgent political themes and bringing, in English, richness and beauty to literature, theatre and action in Europe and the four corners of the world.

Works

Plays

 Keffi's Birthday Treat (1954)
 The Invention (1957)
 The Swamp Dwellers (1958)
 A Quality of Violence (1959)
 The Lion and the Jewel (1959)
 The Trials of Brother Jero (1960)
 A Dance of the Forests (1960)
 My Father's Burden (1960)
 The Strong Breed (1964)
 Before the Blackout (1964)
 Kongi's Harvest (1964)
 The Road (1965)
 Madmen and Specialists (1970)
 The Bacchae of Euripides (1973)
 Camwood on the Leaves (1973)
 Jero's Metamorphosis (1973)
 Death and the King's Horseman (1975)
 Opera Wonyosi (1977)
 Requiem for a Futurologist (1983)
 A Play of Giants (1984)
 Childe Internationale (1987)
 From Zia with Love (1992)
 The Detainee (radio play)
 A Scourge of Hyacinths (radio play)
 The Beatification of Area Boy (1996)
 Document of Identity (radio play, 1999)
 King Baabu (2001)
 Etiki  Revu Wetin
 Alapata Apata (2011)
 "Thus Spake Orunmila" (in Sixty-Six Books (2011)

Novels

 The Interpreters (1965)
 Season of Anomy (1973)
 Chronicles from the Land of the Happiest People on Earth (Bookcraft, Nigeria; Bloomsbury, UK; Pantheon, US, 2021)

Short stories

 A Tale of Two (1958)
 Egbe's Sworn Enemy (1960)
 Madame Etienne's Establishment (1960)

Memoirs

 The Man Died: Prison Notes (1972)
 Aké: The Years of Childhood (1981)
 Ibadan: The Penkelemes Years: a memoir 1945–1965 (1989)
 Ìsarà: A Voyage around Essay (1989)
 You Must Set Forth at Dawn (2006)

Poetry collections

 Telephone Conversation (1963) (appeared in Modern Poetry in Africa)
 Idanre and other poems (1967)
 A Big Airplane Crashed into The Earth (original title Poems from Prison) (1969)
 A Shuttle in the Crypt (1971)
 Ogun Abibiman (1976)
 Mandela's Earth and other poems (1988)
 Early Poems (1997)
 Samarkand and Other Markets I Have Known (2002)

Essays

 "Towards a True Theater" (1962)
 Culture in Transition (1963)
 Neo-Tarzanism: The Poetics of Pseudo-Transition
 A Voice That Would Not Be Silenced
 Art, Dialogue, and Outrage: Essays on Literature and Culture (1988)
 From Drama and the African World View (1976)
 Myth, Literature, and the African World (1976)
 The Blackman and the Veil (1990)
 The Credo of Being and Nothingness (1991)
 The Burden of Memory – The Muse of Forgiveness (1999)
 A Climate of Fear (the BBC Reith Lectures 2004, audio and transcripts)
 New Imperialism (2009)
 Of Africa (2012)
 Beyond Aesthetics: Use, Abuse, and Dissonance in African Art Traditions (2019)

Films

 Kongi's Harvest
 Culture in Transition
 Blues for a Prodigal

Translations

 The Forest of a Thousand Demons: A Hunter’s Saga (1968; a translation of D. O. Fagunwa's Ògbójú Ọdẹ nínú Igbó Irúnmalẹ̀)
 In the Forest of Olodumare (2010; a translation of D. O. Fagunwa's Igbo Olodumare)

See also

 Nigerian literature
 List of 20th-century writers
 List of African writers
 Black Nobel Prize laureates
 Wole Soyinka Prize for Literature in Africa
List of Nigerian writers

Notes

References

Further reading
 C. A. Carpenter (1981). "Studies of Wole Soyinka's Drama: An International Bibliography". Modern Drama 24(1), 96–101. doi:10.1353/mdr.1981.0042.
 
 
 
 
 
 
 Bankole Olayebi (2004), WS: A Life in Full, Bookcraft; biography of Soyinka.
 Ilori, Oluwakemi Atanda (2016), The Theatre of Wole Soyinka: Inside the Liminal World of Myth, Ritual and Postcoloniality. PhD thesis, University of Leeds.
 Mpalive-Hangson Msiska (2007), Postcolonial Identity in Wole Soyinka (Cross/Cultures 93). Amsterdam-New York, NY: Editions Rodopi B.V. 
 Yemi D. Ogunyemi (2009), The Literary/Political Philosophy of Wole Soyinka (PublishAmerica). 
 Yemi D. Ogunyemi (2017), The Aesthetic and Moral Art of Wole Soyinka (Academica Press, London-Washington). 
 Ayo Osisanwo & Muideen Adekunle. "Expressions of Political Consciousness in Wole Soyinka’s Alapata Apata and Femi Osofisan's Morountodun: A Pragma-Stylistic Analysis". Ibadan Journal of English Studies 7 (2011): 521–542.

External links

 Wole Soyinka papers, 1966–1996. Houghton Library, Harvard University.

 
 "Wole Soyinka" Profile, Presidential Lectures, Stanford University
Maya Jaggi, "Profile: Ousting monsters", The Guardian, 2 November 2002
Uchenna Izundu, "Inspiring Nigeria's political dawns", BBC, September 2007.
Amy Goodman, "Legendary Nigerian Writer Wole Soyinka: Darfur Crisis 'A Blot on the Conscience of the World, Democracy Now!, 18 April 2006.
Amy Goodman, "Legendary Nigerian Writer Wole Soyinka on Oil in the Niger Delta, the Effect of Iraq on Africa and His New Memoir", Democracy Now!, 18/19 April 2006.
Dave Gilson, "Wole Soyinka: Running to Stand Still", Mother Jones, July/August 2006.
Paul Brians, "Study guide for The Lion and the Jewel, The Trials of Brother Jero, and Madmen and Specialists", Washington State University.
"The Climate of Fear", Soyinka's Reith Lectures, BBC, 2004.
Uzor Maxim Uzoatu, " The Essential Soyinka", African Writing Online, No. 7.
"Wole Soyinka - Ake: The Years of Childhood", World Book Club, BBC World Service, 29 May 2007.
Martin Banham, "Wole Soyinka: an appreciation", Leeds African Studies Bulletin, 45 (November 1986), pp. 1–2.

1934 births
Living people
20th-century Nigerian dramatists and playwrights
20th-century essayists
20th-century Nigerian novelists
20th-century Nigerian philosophers
20th-century Nigerian poets
20th-century translators
21st-century dramatists and playwrights
21st-century essayists
21st-century Nigerian novelists
21st-century Nigerian poets
Academics of the University of Oxford
Alumni of the University of Leeds
Alumni of University of London Worldwide
Alumni of the University of London
Commanders of the Order of the Federal Republic
Cornell University faculty
Emory University faculty
English-language writers from Nigeria
Fellows of Churchill College, Cambridge
Fellows of the Royal Society of Literature
Former Anglicans
Government College, Ibadan alumni
Granta people
Harvard University faculty
Loyola Marymount University faculty
New York University faculty
Nigerian atheists
Nigerian Civil War prisoners of war
Nigerian dramatists and playwrights
Nigerian essayists
Nigerian expatriate academics in the United States
Nigerian expatriates in the United Kingdom
Nigerian humanists
Nigerian male novelists
Nigerian male poets
Nigerian memoirists
Nigerian Nobel laureates
Nigerian philosophers
Nigerian prisoners and detainees
Soyinka
Nobel laureates in Literature
Academic staff of Obafemi Awolowo University
People educated at Abeokuta Grammar School
Political philosophers
Prisoners and detainees of Nigeria
Ransome-Kuti family
Recipients of the Nigerian National Order of Merit Award
University of Ibadan alumni
Academic staff of the University of Lagos
University of Nevada, Las Vegas faculty
Writers from Abeokuta
Yale University faculty
Yoruba–English translators
Yoruba academics
Yoruba dramatists and playwrights
Yoruba novelists
Yoruba philosophers
Yoruba poets
Yoruba writers
Fellows of the African Academy of Sciences